Anita Kapoor is a television presenter in Singapore. She was born in Mumbai, India but has been living in Singapore since 1978.

Career
Anita has hosted shows on Discovery, TLC, Channel NewsAsia, okto and AXN. Currently she is a host of the show Treasure Hunt on Channel NewsAsia.

References

Singaporean women television presenters
Living people
Singaporean people of Indian descent
Year of birth missing (living people)